Akin Ersoy (born 5 June 1945) is a Turkish sports shooter. He competed in the men's 50 metre free pistol event at the 1976 Summer Olympics.

References

1945 births
Living people
Turkish male sport shooters
Olympic shooters of Turkey
Shooters at the 1976 Summer Olympics
Sportspeople from Istanbul